"Happy Christmas/Heiwa/Miracle" is a triple a-side single by Japanese-American singer-songwriter Ai, released November 2, 2016, by EMI Records. The release served as her first physical single since "Voice" and was her first triple a-side single.

"Happy Christmas" served as commercial tie-in while "Heiwa" served as the theme song for the Japanese version of Storks and "Miracle" served as the theme song for Fuji TV drama Medical Team Lady da Vinci no Shindan.

Upon its physical release, the maxi single peaked at number 55 on the Japanese Oricon Singles chart. "Miracle" peaked at number 84 on the Billboard Japan Hot 100 while "Happy Christmas" and "Heiwa" failed to enter the Japan Hot 100. The three songs originally were intended to be the second single for Ai's eleventh studio album Wa to Yo, but subsequently were not included on the original release of the album. In October 2017, the three songs were included on a deluxe release of Wa to Yo.

Background 
Following the success of "Minna ga Minna ga Eiyū", EMI Records announced Ai's 2015 greatest hits album, The Best would be reissued. The label also released "I'm the Champion", a digital single originally intended as the lead single for Wa to Yo which failed to enter any charts. In September 2016, EMI Records announced Ai would provide a theme song for Storks' Japanese release. Titled "Heiwa", the song was originally released digitally as a promotional single. A few weeks later, a triple a-side maxi single was announced by EMI, set for release on Ai's birthday. Another set of compilations titled The Feast. Best was announced to be released the same day. "Happy Christmas" was used for a commercial tie-in starring Emi Takei. "Miracle" served as the theme song for Fuji TV drama Medical Team Lady da Vinci no Shindan.

Live performances 
Ai performed the songs during her 2016 tour, "The Best Tour". She additionally performed the three songs at Nippon Budokan. Ai also performed "Happy Christmas" at the "Futako Tamagawa Rise Special Live 2016" event at Futako Tamagawa Rise in Tokyo.

Music videos 
Music videos for "Miracle" and "Happy Christmas" were released in December 2016.

Track listing

Charts 
"Happy Christmas/Heiwa/Miracle" peaked at number 55 on the Japanese Oricon Singles chart, charting for four weeks. "Miracle" peaked at number 84 on the Billboard Japan Hot 100.

Credits and personnel 
Credits adapted from Wa to Yo liner notes.
 Ai Carina Uemura – lead vocals, songwriting, producer
 Uta – producer, songwriting
 Da Beatfreakz – producer
 Tha Hitbangaz – co–producer
 Carlos Jenkins – songwriting
 Matthew Quinney – songwriting
 Obi Eble – songwriting
 Uche Eble – songwriting
 Randy Merrill – mastering
 Tom Coyne – mastering

Release history

Notes

References 

2016 singles
2016 songs
Ai (singer) songs
Songs written by Ai (singer)
Song recordings produced by Ai (singer)
EMI Records singles
Japanese television drama theme songs